Hipposonic Studios is a music recording studio in Vancouver, British Columbia, Canada. It was founded in 1989 by Robert Darch.  

The studio houses one mixing, recording and overdubbing room with a Solid State Logic 4000G+ Series. Over the years Hipposonic has had a wide variety of clients, Canadian and international, including Tom Cochrane, Bif Naked, James Brown, Delerium, Prism, Selena Gomez, Jenna Andrews, Econoline Crush, Mother Mother, Skinny Puppy, K-Os, Kinnie Starr, Lamb of God, Swollen Members, Wu-Tang Clan, KISS, Gob, Strapping Young Lad, Colin Linden, Bobby Curtola,  Colin James, Sarah Harmer, Hannah Georgas,  Boom Desjardins, Marianas Trench, Macy Gray, Daniel Wesley, Rammstein, One Bad Son, Moist, Incura, Tegan and Sara, Hey Ocean Hedley, Louise Burns, 5440, Jakalope, Front Line Assembly, Black Mountain, The Mars Volta, The Be Good Tanyas, and Serena Ryder among others.

Hipposonic relocated in January 2017 to a new address at 201 West 7th Avenue, Vancouver, British Columbia Canada.  This was the former home of Little Mountain Sound Studios.

External links
Official website

Recording studios in Canada
Music of Vancouver
Canadian companies established in 1994